The 1999–2000 NBA season was the 33nd season for the Seattle SuperSonics in the National Basketball Association. The SuperSonics had the 13th pick in the 1999 NBA draft, and selected Corey Maggette out of Duke University, but soon traded him to the Orlando Magic in exchange for Horace Grant. The team also acquired Brent Barry from the Chicago Bulls, and signed free agents Vernon Maxwell, second-year forward Ruben Patterson and three-point specialist Chuck Person. Two years removed from the George Karl-era, the Sonics held a 31–20 record at the All-Star break, and managed to make the playoffs after a one-year absence, finishing fourth in the Pacific Division with a 45–37 record. They took the 2nd-seeded Utah Jazz to a fifth and decisive game in the Western Conference First Round before being eliminated on Utah's home floor.

All-Star point guard Gary Payton averaged 24.2 points, 6.5 rebounds, 8.9 assists and 1.9 steals per game, and led the league with 177 three-point field goals. He also earned high individual honors for the season, including All-NBA First Team and NBA All-Defensive First Team selections, while being selected for the 2000 NBA All-Star Game. Payton also finished in sixth place in Most Valuable Player voting, and tied in fifth place in Defensive Player of the Year voting. In addition, Vin Baker averaged 16.6 points and 7.7 rebounds per game, while Barry contributed 11.8 points and 1.3 steals per game, Patterson showed improvement averaging 11.6 points and 5.4 rebounds per game, and Grant provided the team with 8.1 points and 7.8 rebounds per game. Off the bench, Maxwell contributed 10.9 points per game, but only played just 47 games due to a knee injury, and second-year forward Rashard Lewis provided with 8.2 points and 4.1 rebounds per game.

Following the season, Grant was traded to the Los Angeles Lakers after just one season in Seattle, while Maxwell was traded to the New York Knicks, but was released to free agency, and re-signed as a free agent with the Philadelphia 76ers, and Person retired. For the season, the Sonics added new dark red alternate road uniforms, which remained in use until 2001.

Offseason

Draft picks

The 1999 NBA Draft saw the Seattle SuperSonics with the 13th and 41st overall picks, the latter of which was acquired by the Denver Nuggets. With the remaining pick, the Sonics selected Duke University's Corey Maggette, regarded by some as the "best pure athlete in the entire draft."

On draft night, the Sonics traded Maggette to the Orlando Magic, along with veteran players Billy Owens, Don MacLean, and Dale Ellis. In return, the Sonics received veteran forward Horace Grant, a three-time NBA champion with the Michael Jordan-led Chicago Bulls (1991–1993). They also received two future second-round draft picks (No. 42 in 2000 and No. 42 in 2001) in the deal.

Roster

Regular season

Seattle began the season by winning 9 out of their first 11 games, capping off the run with a win over the Houston Rockets on November 20, 1999. Their strong play continued through the month of January, where a 7-game win streak put them at a season-high 14 games over .500 (27–13). Though the Sonics only managed to win 18 of their final 42 games, their early-season success offset their late-season losses, keeping them safely within the playoff picture.

With two games left in the season, the Sonics overcame the Sacramento Kings in overtime to secure the 7th seed in the Western Conference. This assured that the team would avoid the 1st-seeded Los Angeles Lakers, who finished the season with an NBA-best 67–15, in the first round of the playoffs. Particularly, the seeding eliminated the possibility of unfavorable match-ups with a young Kobe Bryant and season MVP Shaquille O'Neal.

The Sonics would lose their final game of the regular season and finish with a 45–37 record.

Season standings

z – clinched division title
y – clinched division title
x – clinched playoff spot

Record vs. opponents

Playoffs

|- align="center" bgcolor="#ffcccc"
| 1
| April 22
| @ Utah
| L 93–104
| Gary Payton (24)
| Gary Payton (11)
| Gary Payton (6)
| Delta Center19,911
| 0–1
|- align="center" bgcolor="#ffcccc"
| 2
| April 24
| @ Utah
| L 87–101
| Gary Payton (20)
| Vin Baker (7)
| Shammond Williams (10)
| Delta Center19,911
| 0–2
|- align="center" bgcolor="#ccffcc"
| 3
| April 29
| Utah
| W 89–78
| Gary Payton (23)
| Vin Baker (11)
| Gary Payton (10)
| KeyArena16,713
| 1–2
|- align="center" bgcolor="#ccffcc"
| 4
| May 3
| Utah
| W 104–93
| Gary Payton (35)
| Gary Payton (10)
| Gary Payton (11)
| KeyArena16,631
| 2–2
|- align="center" bgcolor="#ffcccc"
| 5
| May 5
| @ Utah
| L 93–96
| Gary Payton (27)
| three players tied (7)
| Gary Payton (9)
| Delta Center19,911
| 2–3
|-

Player statistics

Season

Playoffs

Awards and records
 Gary Payton, All-NBA First Team
 Gary Payton, NBA All-Defensive First Team

Transactions

References

Seattle SuperSonics seasons
Seattle